"One Night" is a dance single written and recorded by the British production/remix project WTS (an acronym for What's That Sound and the first letters of the project's members, Will Mount, Terence "TiE" Roberts & Sam East) featuring American vocalist Gia Bella. It was released in 2016 as the project's debut single and became the first number-one hit for both artists in the United States, when it topped the Billboard Dance Club Songs chart in May 2016.

Track listing
 Digital download 
One Night (featuring Gia) (Damien Hall Mix) 3:43
One Night (featuring Gia) (AngerWolf Club Mix) 4:33
One Night (featuring Gia) (Simone Bresciani Club Mix) 6:11
One Night (featuring Gia) (Simone Bresciani Radio Mix) 3:15
One Night (featuring Gia) (Tracy Young Club Mix) 6:36
One Night (featuring Gia) (Stonebridge Club Instrumental) 6:11
One Night (featuring Gia) (StoneBridge Radio Mix) 3:21
One Night (featuring Gia) (StoneBridge Radio Instrumental) 3:21
One Night (featuring Gia) (StoneBridge Dub Mix) 5:11
One Night (featuring Gia) (StoneBridge Club Mix) 6:11
One Night (featuring Gia) (The Scene Kings Club Mix) 4:44
One Night (featuring Gia) (The Scene Kings Radio Mix) 3:25
One Night (featuring Gia) (Mike Rizzo Funk Generation After Hours Radio Mix) 4:07
One Night (featuring Gia) (Mike Rizzo Funk Generation After Hours Mix) 5:42
One Night (featuring Gia) (Mike Rizzo Funk Generation Club Mix) 6:01
One Night (featuring Gia) (Mike Rizzo Funk Generation Radio Mix) 4:12

See also
 List of number-one dance singles of 2016 (U.S.)

References

External links
 WTS productions Official site
 

2016 songs
2016 debut singles
Dance-pop songs
Eurodance songs